Felix Imre (19 November 1917 – 2 November 1943) was an Austrian soldier of the German Wehrmacht and a Resistance fighter. He was sentenced to death by Volksgerichtshof and decapitated.

Life and work
Imre was born in the village of Pottenstein close to Vienna. As a young man he joined NSDAP and SA when both organizations were still illegal in Austria. He participated in World War II and was awarded an Iron Cross (second class) for his merits in the battle of France. Due to his war experiences he repositioned himself politically and, in 1941, joined an Austrian resistance group . This group was part of the Communist Youth of Austria. Together with Elfriede Hartmann, and others, he produced flyers and letters to soldiers calling for resistance against the regime and an end of the cruel war. On 13 April 1942 Imre was arrested and thereafter heavily tortured by the Gestapo.

In all, 13 members of the resistance group Soldatenrat were sentenced to death and decapitated at the Regional Court of Vienna. The six women and seven men were in the age of 18 to 25 when they were brought to death. Five weeks after his trial, Imre was guillotined.

Commemoration 
Imre's name is listed on the Memorial Plaque for 536 persons executed by the Nazi jurisdiction for political reasons in Vienna between 1942 and 1945. The plaque is located in the former execution hall of Vienna's regional court. The corpse of Imre was buried in a shaft grave complex at the Zentralfriedhof of Vienna, where most of the beheaded men and women were interred. The grave can be found in Section 40 (Row 26, Grave 190).

In October 1988 his home village, Pottenstein, dedicated a memorial stone to "Felix Imre and all citizens of the village who became victims of fascism". The memorial stone can be found in the Josef-Stockinger-Park.

References
Sources
Erkennungsdienstliche Kartei der Gestapo Wien (Gestapo records), scientifically processed by the Documentation Centre of Austrian Resistance, with photographs, retrieved February 21, 2015
 Willi Weinert: „Mich könnt ihr löschen, aber nicht das Feuer“: ein Führer durch den Ehrenhain der Gruppe 40 am Wiener Zentralfriedhof für die hingerichteten WiderstandskämpferInnen. Verlag Alfred-Klahr-Gesellschaft, 2005, 80, 153 

Notes

1917 births
1943 deaths
Austrian military personnel of World War II
Austrian people executed by Nazi Germany
Executed military personnel
People executed by Nazi Germany by guillotine
People condemned by Nazi courts
Austrian resistance members
Austrian communists
Executed communists in the German Resistance